Arthotheliopsis hymenocarpoides is a species of foliicolous lichen in the family Gomphillaceae. It is the type species of the genus Arthotheliopsis. Both the genus and species were described as new by Finnish lichenologist Edvard August Vainio in 1896. The type specimens were collected by botanist William Robert Elliott from Saint Vincent, where they were found growing on the leaves of a tree in Bonhomme forest. This collection was part of his work for the West India Natural History Exploration Committee. At the time, Vainio was an expert on tropical lichens, so the specimens were sent to him for identification.

References

Ostropales
Lichen species
Lichens described in 1896
Lichens of Asia
Lichens of the Caribbean
Lichens of Brazil
Taxa named by Edvard August Vainio